The 2002–03 Auburn Tigers men's basketball team represented Auburn University in the 2002–03 college basketball season. The team's head coach was Cliff Ellis, who was in his ninth season at Auburn. The team played their home games at Beard–Eaves–Memorial Coliseum in Auburn, Alabama. They finished the season 22–12, 8–8 in SEC play. They defeated  to advance to the semifinals of the SEC tournament where they lost to Kentucky. They received an at-large bid to the NCAA tournament where they defeated Saint Joseph's and Wake Forest to advance to the Sweet Sixteen where they lost to Syracuse.

Roster

Schedule and results

|-
!colspan=9 style="background:#172240; color:white;"| Exhibition

|-
!colspan=9 style="background:#172240; color:white;"| Regular season

|-
!colspan=9 style="background:#172240; color:white;" | SEC tournament

|-
!colspan=9 style="background:#172240; color:white;" | NCAA tournament

References

Auburn Tigers men's basketball seasons
Auburn
Auburn
Auburn
Auburn